Marcel Cadolle (21 December 1885, in Paris – 21 August 1956, in Paris) was a French professional road bicycle racer.

In 1907 Cadolle rode a good Tour de France, having finished in the top 6 of all of the first six stages, winning the fourth stage. Before the seventh stage, Cadolle was second in the classification. In that seventh stage, Cadolle fell, and as a result he had to stop his cycling career.

Major results

1906
Bordeaux–Paris
1907
Tour de France:
Winner stage 4

External links 

French male cyclists
French Tour de France stage winners
1885 births
1956 deaths
Cyclists from Paris